Buffalo Harbor South Entrance Light, also known as the South Buffalo Southside Light or Buffalo South Breakwater, South Entrance Light Station, is a lighthouse at Stony Point at the entrance to Buffalo Harbor, Buffalo, New York.  It was established in 1903 and deactivated in 1993. It was  replaced by a nearby modern post light.  The lighthouse property consists of a three-story cast iron  decommissioned light tower topped with a lantern; one-story concrete fog signal building and an L-shaped concrete pier.

It was listed on the National Register of Historic Places in 2007.

References

Further reading
 Oleszewski, Wes. Great Lakes Lighthouses, American and Canadian: A Comprehensive Directory/Guide to Great Lakes Lighthouses, (Gwinn, Michigan: Avery Color Studios, Inc., 1998) .
 
 U.S. Coast Guard. Historically Famous Lighthouses (Washington, D.C.: Government Printing Office, 1957).
 Wright, Larry and Wright, Patricia. Great Lakes Lighthouses Encyclopedia Hardback (Erin: Boston Mills Press, 2006)

External links
 Notice of Availability, July 23, 2008
 "Vacant South Buffalo Lighthouse is for sale: 105-year-old structure being marketed first to local organizations," By Sharon Linstedt, The Buffalo News, August 26, 2008
 Amateur Radio Lighthouse Society website
 
 Lighthouses of the Great Lakes

Lighthouses completed in 1903
Lighthouses on the National Register of Historic Places in New York (state)
Lighthouses in Erie County, New York
National Register of Historic Places in Buffalo, New York